The Santa Ana Municipality is one of the 21 municipalities (municipios) that makes up the eastern Venezuelan Anzoátegui State and, according to the 2011 census by the National Institute of Statistics of Venezuela, the municipality has a population of 9,636. The town of Santa Ana is the shire town of the Santa Ana Municipality.

Demographics
The Santa Ana Municipality, according to a 2007 population estimate by the National Institute of Statistics of Venezuela, has a population of 10,919 (up from 9,675 in 2000). This amounts to 0.7% of the state's population.

Government
The mayor of the Santa Ana Municipality is Gerson Martínez, re-elected November 23, 2008 with 49% of the vote. The municipality is divided into two parishes; Capital Santa Ana and Pueblo Nuevo.

See also
Santa Ana
Anzoátegui
Municipalities of Venezuela

References

External links
santaana-anzoategui.gob.ve 

Municipalities of Anzoategui